The Yokosuka E6Y was a Japanese submarine-based reconnaissance seaplane developed at the Yokosuka Naval Air Technical Arsenal for the Imperial Japanese Navy during the 1920s. The prototype first flew as the Yokosho 2-Go in 1929.

The aircraft was a single-seat biplane that could be quickly assembled and disassembled so that it could be stored on board a submarine. Two prototypes were built that differed in power plant and design details. They saw limited action during the January 28 incident and the Second Sino-Japanese War, the last example being retired in 1943.

Development
The Imperial Japanese Navy was a pioneer in naval aviation, starting as early as 1912 with the purchase of two floatplanes from Britain and one from the United States. Alongside that development, the Navy also looked at aircraft as a way to extend the operational reach of their large submarine force. Aware of the challenge of operations in the large expanse of the Pacific Ocean, the Navy was particularly looking at ways to improve their reconnaissance capability and saw submarine-based aircraft as a complement to land--based patrol. They acquired a German Caspar U.1 from the United States and a Parnall Peto from Britain, both early submarine-based reconnaissance aircraft. The two aircraft formed the basis for two prototype Japanese aircraft built for submarine-based reconnaissance, the 1-Go based on the former, while the latter heavily influenced the 2-Go.

Design
The , which was abbreviated to Yokosho, developed the 2-Go as a smaller aircraft that the Peto. It was a biplane of mixed construction, with a steel frame and wooden-framed wings, covered in canvas. The wings were designed to detach for storage, as was the twin float assembly, which was also wooden.

The second prototype, designated 2-Go Kai, differed in a number of details. Lateral stability issues were resolved by increasing the tail fin and rudder, extending them upward.

In 1931, the Kawanishi Aircraft Company was commissioned to produce eight production machines, designated E6Y1, based on the 2-Go Kai, which were built between 1932 and 1934.

Operational history

The Navy took delivery of the 2-Go in May 1929 and initially tested it aboard the submarine . Testing was completed by September 1931. The 2-Go Kai commenced testing in 1931 initially also on board I-51 and then subsequently the Junsen I Mod type submarine . I-5 was not fitted with a hangar, but rather the aircraft was disassembled and stored in two cylindrical containers, one for the fuselage and the other for the wings, stored on the deck. Launch was initially from the water, but a catapult was fitted to I-5 in 1933 and this was found more satisfactory. All subsequent Japanese aircraft-carrying submarines used catapults.

The aircraft also saw surface ship use. They saw limited service during the January 28 incident in 1932, providing reconnaissance, and subsequently there are reports that they served on submarines that operated during the Second Sino-Japanese War. Between 1937 and 1938, submarines I-5 and I-6 were assigned to the Third Fleet (China Theatre Fleet) based at Hong Kong to patrol and blockade the central and southern Chinese coasts. As the Japanese Navy introduced larger aircraft carrying submarines, the E6Y was superseded by the Watanabe E9W. The last example retired in 1943.

Variants
Yokosho 2-Go
First prototype equipped with a  Mitsubishi-licensed Armstrong Siddeley Mongoose.
Yokosho 2-Go Kai
E6Y1
Production version of the 2-Go Kai manufactured by Kawanishi.

Operators

 Imperial Japanese Navy Air Service

Specifications (E6Y1)

See also

References

Bibliography

External links
 Multiplan view of the aircraft
Photo

Aircraft first flown in 1929
Floatplanes
Kawanishi aircraft
1920s Japanese military reconnaissance aircraft
Single-engined tractor aircraft
Submarine-borne aircraft
E6Y